Mill Creek is a  long 2nd order tributary to Richardson Creek in Union County, North Carolina.

Course
Mill Creek rises in a pond about 1.5 miles northeast of Unionville, North Carolina and then flows south-southeast to join Richardson Creek about 5 miles east-northeast of Fowler Crossroads.

Watershed
Mill Creek drains  of area, receives about 48.5 in/year of precipitation, has a wetness index of 426.53, and is about 39% forested.

References

Rivers of North Carolina
Rivers of Union County, North Carolina